The Historic Inner East neighborhood is located in Dayton, Ohio, United States. The neighborhood boundaries include two historic districts: Saint Anne's Hill Historic District and Huffman Historic District. The neighborhood has a population of a little over 3,000 (as of 2010 census).

Businesses
Several businesses are located in Historic Inner East including:
 Gem City Catfe
 Gordons Jewelry & Loan
 RSC Sales
 M & R Electric Motor Service, Inc.
 U-Haul Moving & Storage of Dayton
 5th Street Brewpub
 The Front Street Building Company

References

External links
 Preservation Dayton
 Historic District Map
 City of Dayton Neighborhood Map
 City of Dayton's Official Website

Neighborhoods in Dayton, Ohio